The Division of Parkes is an Australian electoral division in the state of New South Wales.

History

The former Division of Parkes (1901–1969) was located in suburban Sydney, and was not related to this division, except in name.

The division is named after Sir Henry Parkes, seventh Premier of New South Wales and sometimes known as the 'Father of Federation'. The division was proclaimed at the redistribution of 11 October 1984, and was first contested at the 1984 federal election. The seat is currently a safe Nationals seat. It was substantially changed by the 2006 redistribution and is now considered by many observers as the successor to the abolished Division of Gwydir. As a result, the then member for Parkes, John Cobb, instead contested the Division of Calare. The current Member for Parkes, since the 2007 federal election, is Mark Coulton, a member of the National Party of Australia.

According to the 2011 census, approximately 78 per cent of the population within the division identify as Christian, more than any other electorate in Australia at that time.

Boundaries
Since 1984, federal electoral division boundaries in Australia have been determined at redistributions by a redistribution committee appointed by the Australian Electoral Commission. Redistributions occur for the boundaries of divisions in a particular state, and they occur every seven years, or sooner if a state's representation entitlement changes or when divisions of a state are malapportioned.

The largest electorate in the state, it is located in the far north west of the state, adjoining the border with Queensland in the north and with South Australia in the west. Its largest population centre is Dubbo. It also includes the towns of Broken Hill, Dunedoo, Coonabarabran, Coonamble, Walgett, Narrabri, Moree, Warren, Nyngan, Cobar and Bourke.

Members

Election results

References

External links
 Division of Parkes - Australian Electoral Commission

Electoral divisions of Australia
Constituencies established in 1984
1984 establishments in Australia
North West Slopes
New England (New South Wales)